The 1899–1900 City Cup was the sixth edition of the City Cup, a cup competition in Irish football.

The tournament was won by Linfield for the fourth time.

Group standings

References

1899–1900 in Irish association football